Dilley High School is a public high school located in the city of Dilley, Texas, United States and classified as a 3A school by the UIL.  It is a part of the Dilley Independent School District located in south central Frio County.   In 2015, the school was rated "Met Standard" by the Texas Education Agency.

Athletics
The Dilley Wolves compete in these sports - 

Volleyball, Cross Country, Football, Basketball, Powerlifting, Golf, Tennis, Track, Baseball & Softball

State Titles
Boys Cross Country  - 
1997(2A)

References

External links
Dilley ISD website

Public high schools in Texas
Schools in Frio County, Texas